Jorge Luis Ghiso (born June 21, 1951 in Buenos Aires, Argentina) is an Argentine football manager and former Argentine footballer who played for clubs in Argentina, Chile, Mexico and Colombia.

Teams (Player)
  River Plate 1970-1975
  Atlético Tucumán 1975
  Universidad de Chile 1976-1978
  Estudiantes de La Plata 1979
  Estudiantes Tecos 1979-1980
  Atlético Tucumán 1980
  Unión Magdalena 1981-1983
  Everton 1984-1985

Teams (Coach)
  Atlanta 1992-1993
  Instituto de Córdoba 1993-1994
  Atlanta 1994-1997
  Atlético Rafaela 1997-1998
  Atlético Rafaela 2001-2002
  Atlético Rafaela 2006-2007
  Ferro Carril Oeste 2009
  Quilmes 2010
  Independiente Rivadavia 2010
  Atlanta 2010-2012

Titles (Player)
  River Plate 1975 (Primera División Argentina Championship (Nacional and Metropolitana))
  Universidad de Chile 1976 (Copa Sudamericana de Clubes Universitarios)

References
 
 

1951 births
Living people
Argentine footballers
Argentine football managers
Argentine expatriate footballers
Footballers from Buenos Aires
Estudiantes de La Plata footballers
Atlético Tucumán footballers
Club Atlético River Plate footballers
Unión Magdalena footballers
Tecos F.C. footballers
Universidad de Chile footballers
Everton de Viña del Mar footballers
Chilean Primera División players
Argentine Primera División players
Liga MX players
Categoría Primera A players
Expatriate football managers in Chile
Expatriate footballers in Chile
Expatriate footballers in Mexico
Expatriate footballers in Colombia
Atlético de Rafaela managers
Association football midfielders
Audax Italiano managers